The 2014 Inter-Provincial Championship is the second season of the Inter-Provincial Championship, the domestic three-day (though not officially first-class) cricket competition of Ireland. The competition is played between Leinster Lightning, Northern Knights and North West Warriors.

This year's competition was won by the Leinster Lightning, who secured a draw in their final match of the season to win the title.  They retained the Championship, having won the inaugural Inter-Provincial Championship.

The Inter-Provincial Series has been funded at least partly by the ICC via their TAPP programme.

Standings

Squads

Fixtures

External links

See also
2014 Inter-Provincial Cup
2014 Inter-Provincial Trophy
2014 Irish cricket season

Inter-Provincial Championship seasons
Inter